Mikhail Vadimovich Kovalenko (born 25 January 1995) is a Russian footballer who plays for Armenian Premier League club Pyunik.

Club career
Kovalenko made his debut in the Russian Professional Football League for FC Dynamo Saint Petersburg on 20 July 2015 in a game against FC Khimki. He made his Russian Football National League debut for Dynamo Saint Petersburg on 19 August 2017 in a game against FC Tom Tomsk.

References

External links
 
 Profile by Russian Professional Football League
 
 

1995 births
Living people
Russian footballers
Association football defenders
FC Dynamo Saint Petersburg players
FC Zenit Saint Petersburg players
FC Tyumen players
PFC Sochi players
FC Noah players
FC Olimp-Dolgoprudny players
Russian First League players
Russian Second League players
Armenian Premier League players
Russian expatriate footballers
Expatriate footballers in Armenia
Russian expatriate sportspeople in Armenia